In molecular biology, Glycoside hydrolase family 12 is a family of glycoside hydrolases.

Glycoside hydrolases  are a widespread group of enzymes that hydrolyse the glycosidic bond between two or more carbohydrates, or between a carbohydrate and a non-carbohydrate moiety. A classification system for glycoside hydrolases, based on sequence similarity, has led to the definition of >100 different families. This classification is available on the CAZy web site, and also discussed at CAZypedia, an online encyclopedia of carbohydrate active enzymes.

Glycoside hydrolase family 12 CAZY GH_12 comprises enzymes with the following activities: endoglucanase, xyloglucan hydrolase, β-1,3-1,4-glucanase and xyloglucan endotransglycosylase. These enzymes were formerly known as cellulase family H.

References 

EC 3.2.1
Protein families
GH family